Kenneth Osberg Nilsen (born 2 November 1994), known professionally as K-391, is a Norwegian music producer. He is best known for his 2018 single "Ignite", a song featuring Alan Walker, Julie Bergan and Seungri which reached number one in Norway.

Career
K-391 began his career as an artist in 2009, then known as Keosni. Later he changed it to KON-391, an acronym of his full name accompanied the figures "391" meaning "CIA" by the order of each letter of the alphabet. Then he finally shortened it to K-391. In 2013 on British record label NoCopyrightSounds promoted his song "Dream Of Something Sweet", featuring Cory Friesenhan, on 22 December 2013. His final song on the label was "Earth", released on 30 April 2016.

In 2017, K-391 and Alan Walker released their collaborative single "Ignite" which is a reboot of his 2015 track "Godzilla" which featured vocalist Marvin Divine. Although the song was a collaboration, Nilsen was only credited as a feature on the song. The song, which was originally released as an instrumental, was released on 7 April 2017, through Walker's record label MER as well as Sony Music. A version of the song, featuring vocals by Norwegian singer-songwriter Julie Bergan and South Korean singer Seungri was later released on 11 May 2018. Although the instrumental was released through Mer Musikk and Sony Music, the vocal interpretation was released under Liquid State, a record label that focuses on electronic dance music. The vocal interpretation was praised as being significantly better than the instrumental and it was a huge success for K-391. K-391 went on to further collaborate with Alan Walker, remixing such songs as "Tired" and "All Falls Down".

On 30 November 2018, K-391 collaborated with Alan Walker and American singer Sofia Carson on the single "Different World", featuring CORSAK, through MER Musikk and Sony Music Entertainment. The track is a reboot of Nilsen's 2014 track called "Sevje" On 14 December 2018, the single appeared on Alan Walker's debut album of the same name, alongside "Lily" with Emelie Hollow which is the remake from Nilsen's song called "Flux" from "How To Make An Epic Rap Beat" on his YouTube Channel. K-391 later collaborated with Scandinavian producers Martin Tungevaag, Mangoo and Alan Walker to create a remake of Mangoo's "Eurodancer", originally released in 2000. The collaboration was released on 30 August 2019 under the name "Play". In March 2020, Nilsen with Alan Walker and Ahrix created a single called End Of Time, the remake version of Ahrix's mega-popular 2013 track Nova incorporating uncredited vocals provided by American born Swedish songwriter Kristin Carpenter. In October 2020, he, along with RØRY made a new song called Aurora.

On 24 September 2021, K-391 collaborated with Alan Walker and Boy In Space on the song Paradise, released as part of World of Walker. Also,   he appeared on a live performance video released as a follow up of the track. On 12 November 2021, he collaborated with Linko on the song Go Home, featuring Mentum, a reboot of their old track  Away.

In 2022, K391 decided he would become independent and released Nightmare ft Julianne Aurora. He went onto release tracks such as 'Lighthouse' with Julianne Aurora, 'Lonely World' with Victor Crone and 'Not Out of My Mind' with Xillions.
In Feb 2023, he released 'Magic' with Brother Leo under UMG.

Discography
The discography of Norwegian Music Producer K-391 consists of 2 compilation albums, 12 singles, 5 remixes and 6 music videos.

Compilation albums
- Hello, World
 Released: 1 August 2018
 Label: IIIIXI AS, MER
 Format: Digital Download
- Cyber Reality
 Released: 13 January 2022
 Label: K-391
 Format: Digital Download

Singles

As lead artist

As featured artist

Remixes

Music videos

References

External links
 

Living people
Norwegian record producers
Norwegian house musicians
Electro house musicians
Norwegian DJs
NoCopyrightSounds artists
People from Bamble
People from Ås, Akershus
1994 births
Music-related YouTube channels
Norwegian YouTubers
FL Studio users